Emmanuel T. Cabajar (also known as Manny Cabajar) is a Filipino bishop of the Catholic Church. He was Bishop of Pagadian from 2004 to 2018.

Background

Cabajar was born on 8 October 1942, in Jandayan Island, Jetafe, Talibon, Bohol, Philippines. He entered priesthood as a member of the Congregation of the Most Holy Redeemer.

He attended Philosophy at the St. Alphonsus Seminary in Cebu City. He attained a master's degree and doctorate in Moral theology from St. Anthelmo in Rome and in Madrid, Spain, respectively.

Priest
Cabajar lectured extensively on moral theology. He also served the Church in key positions.

Bishop
Pope John Paul II named him Bishop of Pagadian on 14 May 2004. He received his episcopal consecration from Cardinal Ricardo Jamin Vidal on 14 August and was installed on 2 September. As Bishop of Pagadian, he governed the sixteen Diocesan Schools of Pagadian. He also sits as chairman of the Board of Trustees of Saint Columban College.

In the Catholic Bishops' Conference of the Philippines, he has served as chairman, Vice Chairman, and member of episcopal commissions.

In February 2017, Cabajar played host to Msgr. Jose R. Manguiran, Bishop Emeritus of Dipolog, and delegates of the Mindanao Convention on Family and Life held in Pagadian City. A week after, he played host again to the delegates of the National Convention on Family and Life, led by Archbishop Gilbert A. Garcera of the Archdiocese of Lipa.

Pope Francis accepted his resignation as bishop on 22 November 2018.

References

External links

1942 births
Living people
21st-century Roman Catholic bishops in the Philippines
People from Bohol